European striate mosaic virus (EWSMV) is a plant pathogenic virus of the genus Tenuivirus.

External links
ICTVdB - The Universal Virus Database: European striate mosaic virus
Family Groups - The Baltimore Method

Viral plant pathogens and diseases
Tenuiviruses